Ledereragrotis difficilis is a moth of the family Noctuidae. It is found in Mongolia and southern Sibiria.

The length of the fore wings is about 15 mm.

External links
Colour Atlas of the Siberian Lepidoptera
Die Trockenwälder der baumförmigen Juniperus-Arten

Noctuinae
Moths described in 1887